Ghurak-e Sofla (also Romanized as Ghūrak-e Soflá; also known as Ghūrak-e Pā’īn) is a village in Babuyi Rural District, Basht District, Basht County, Kohgiluyeh and Boyer-Ahmad Province, Iran. At the 2006 census, its population was 72, in 17 families.

References 

Populated places in Basht County